Ikela Airport  is an airport serving the market town of Ikela in Tshuapa Province, Democratic Republic of the Congo.

See also

 Transport in the Democratic Republic of the Congo
 List of airports in the Democratic Republic of the Congo

References

External links
 FallingRain - Ikela Airport
 SkyVector - Ikela Airport
 OpenStreetMap - Ikela
 OurAirports - Ikela
 

Airports in Tshuapa Province